The 2022 Stanford Cardinal men's soccer team represents Stanford University during the 2022 NCAA Division I men's soccer season. They are led by eleventh year head coach Jeremy Gunn.

Previous season
The Cardinal had a down year. They finished conference play at 2–4–4, 4th place in the Pac-12 season and 6–6–6 overall. The Cardinal were not invited to play in the postseason tournament.

Preseason Media polls

Source:

Offseason

2022 recruiting class
Source:

Departures

Roster 
Source:

Schedule

|-
!colspan=6 style=""| Exhibition

|-
!colspan=6 style=""| Regular season

|-
!colspan=6 style=""| NCAA Tournament

Rankings

References

2022
2022 Pac-12 Conference men's soccer season
American men's college soccer teams 2022 season
2022 in sports in California
Stanford